Eslamabad-e Bala (also Romanized as Eslāmābād-e Bālā; also known as Eslāmābād) is a village in Mazraeh-ye Shomali Rural District, Voshmgir District, Aqqala County, Golestan Province, Iran. At the 2006 census, its population was 1,251, in 240 families.

References 

Populated places in Aqqala County